Clifford Marshall "Marsh" Davis is an American politician and pharmacist serving as a member of the Arkansas House of Representatives for the 61st district. Elected in November 2018, he assumed office on January 14, 2019.

Early life and education 
Davis was born in Memphis, Tennessee and raised in Cherokee Village, Arkansas. He earned a Bachelor of Science degree in zoology from Arkansas State University and a Doctor of Pharmacy from the University of Arkansas for Medical Sciences.

Career 
Outside of politics, Davis works as a pharmacist for Walgreens. He was elected to the Arkansas House of Representatives in November 2018 and assumed office on January 14, 2019. He serves as the chair of the House Subcommittee on Human Services and previously served as chair of the House Subcommittee on Juvenile Justice and Child Support.

References 

Living people
Arkansas Republicans
People from Memphis, Tennessee
Arkansas State University alumni
University of Arkansas for Medical Sciences alumni
American pharmacists
Walgreens people
21st-century American politicians
Year of birth missing (living people)